The Muppets: A Green and Red Christmas is a Christmas album by The Muppets. The album was released by Walt Disney Records on October 17, 2006 on CD and as a digital download in the iTunes Store.

In 2008, the album won a Grammy Award for Best Musical Album for Children.

The album was reissued on November 1, 2011, as part of the marketing promotion for the film The Muppets.

Track listing

Muppet performers
Steve Whitmire as Kermit the Frog, Rizzo the Rat, Statler
Eric Jacobson as Miss Piggy, Fozzie Bear, Animal
Dave Goelz as Gonzo,  Waldorf, Zoot
Bill Barretta as Rowlf the Dog, Pepé the King Prawn, Dr. Teeth, Swedish Chef
John Kennedy as Sgt. Floyd Pepper
Additional performers include: Louise Gold, Jerry Nelson, Karen Prell, Mike Quinn, and David Rudman

See also
Kermit Unpigged
Muppets: The Green Album
The Muppets: Original Soundtrack

References

External links
Official site at Walt Disney Records
Muppet Central review

Disney albums
Green And Red Christmas, A
Grammy Award for Best Musical Album for Children
2006 Christmas albums
Walt Disney Records albums
Walt Disney Records Christmas albums